Leopoldo Bersani (Bologna, 6 April 1848 - Montevideo, 1903) was an Italian painter and sculptor who moved to Uruguay as a young adult.

Bibliography 

He studied literature, painting, and design in Bologna. In 1866, he joined the Cacciatore Volante forces of Giuseppe Garibaldi, fighting in the Tyrol against the Austrians. 
 
By the next year he had relocated to Montevideo. There he became known as painter and teacher. He was known for his portraits.

References 

1848 births
1903 deaths
Artists from Bologna
19th-century Italian painters
Italian male painters
Italian emigrants to Uruguay
Artists from Montevideo
19th-century Italian male artists